Muhammad Faquir Khatian (1878 -  4 February 1941)  was a classical Sufi poet of Sindh, Pakistan. He was one the best Sindhi and Seraiki Sufi poets of Sindh during the British Raj in India (Now Pakistan).

Biography 
Muhammad Faquir Khatian was born in 1878 in the house of Rais Hyder Khan Khatian at Village Sulaiman Khatian of Matiari district, Sindh, Pakistan. The village Sulaiman Khatian is located at a distance of about 7 kilometers northeast of Tando Jam. As per custom of that time he studied Arabic, Persian and Quranic studies at his home village. Due to death of his father, he had to discontinue his formal education, however, whenever he had time, he would learn Persian from Abdul Rehman Samoo of Village Karnani Samoo. For a short period of time, he worked as a manager of Rais Ghulam Muhammad Khan Bhurgri at village Dengan Bhurgri, taluka Kot Ghulam Muhammad but he quit that job and returned to his village.

He was a follower of  Pir Pagara, the spiritual leader of Hur Jammait of Sindh. He joined Hur force of Pir Pagara in 1915-16 and remained part of this force for a few years.

He was fond of spiritual music, poetry and Sufic way of life since childhood. He was highly inspired by the Sufi poetry of Nawab Wali Muhammad Leghari, the legendary poet and Sufi master of Sindh. Under his guidance and company, Muhammad Faquir himself became a great Sufi poet. His poetry achieved its full blossom under the spiritual patronage of Makhdoom Ghulam Hyder, the successor of Sufi saint Makhdoom Nooh of Hala. He used to  use the Yaktaro (single-stringed instrument) and Chaparyoon (a pair of wooden instruments)  while singing his own poetry with his faquirs (companions). This way of singing Sufi kalam (poetry) is still popular in rural Sindh.

His Sindhi and Seraiki poetry collection titled as Mantooq-e-Muhammadi (Sindhi: منطوق محمدي) was compiled and published by Makhdoom Muhammad Zaman Talibul Maula in 1950. The second and third edition of the same was published by Rais Ahmad Khan Khatian in 2002 and 2008 respectively.

A dictionary of poetry of Muhammad Faqir and Mahmood Faqir Khatian titled as Akhar Akhar men Israr (Sindhi: اکر اکر ۾ اسرار) was compiled by Inayat Unar and published by Sindhi Lanuage Authority in 2014.

Death 
Muhammad Faquir Khatian died on 4 February 1941 and was buried in his native village Sulaiman Khan Khatian.

References 

Sufi poets
Sindhi-language poets
Sindhi people
 People from Matiari District
1878 births
1941 deaths